Events from the year 1964 in Denmark.

Incumbents
 Monarch – Frederick IX
 Prime minister – Jens Otto Krag

Events
 21 March – Denmark hosts the Eurovision Song Contest and finishes in 9th place.
 22 September – The 1964 parliamentary election is held.

Sport
 January–February – Denmark participates in the 1964 Winter Olympics.
 October – Denmark participates in the 1964 Summer Olympics and wins six medals.

Badminton
 14 April  All England Open Badminton Championships
 Knud Aage Nielsen wins gold in Men's Single
 Finn Kobberø and Jørgen Hammergaard Hansen win gold in Men's Double
 Karin Jørgensen and Ulla Strand win gold in Women's Double

Football
30 March – the 1964 Jutland Series is launched
 7 May  Esbjerg fB wins the 1963–64 Danish Cup by defeating KFUMs Boldklub Odense 21 in the final.
 17–20 June – Denmark participates in 1964 European Nations' Cup in France.
 17 June – Denmark is defeated by the Soviet Union in the semi-final.
 20 June – Denmark is defeated by Hungary in the bronze match.
15 November – the 1964 Jutland Series final is played

Births
 4 February – Marianne Gaarden, bishop
 15 May – Lars Løkke Rasmussen, politician and prime minister
 1 June – Marianne Florman, handball player
 15 June – Michael Laudrup, football player
 11 October – Christian Dyrvig, businessman

Deaths
 27 March – Emil Reesen, composer, conductor and pianist (born 1887)
 10 May – Harald Tandrup, writer (born 1874)
 14 July – Prince Axel of Denmark (born 1888)
 21 October – Carl Johan Hviid, actor (born 1899)
 26 November – Bodil Ipsen, actress and film director (born 1889)

Date unknown
 September – Arild Rosenkrantz, nobleman, painter, sculptor, stained-glass artist and illustrator (born 1870)

See also
1964 in Danish television

References

 
Denmark
Years of the 20th century in Denmark
1960s in Denmark